Ferdinand Victor Alphons Prosch (November 25, 1820 in Copenhagen – July 29, 1885) was a Danish doctor, veterinarian and biologist.

Prosch's father, Johannes Henrik William Prosch (died 1843) was a secretary in the Danish War Chancery and his mother, Caroline Sophie (née Brement) was French. In 1837 Prosch was a student at the Metropolitan School in Copenhagen and by 1843 he had taken his medical exams.  Between 1843 and 1846 Prosch was employed by the University as a prosector, i.e. a preparer of specimens for dissection in the University's Zoological museum.

In 1847 he joined the Flaaden as the ship's doctor on a voyage to Madeira. Guinea, Venezuela and the Caribbean. In 1848 he was the ship's doctor on the frigate Havfrue ("Mermaid") in the First Schleswig War. After the war practiced as a doctor in Copenhagen and was a teacher of natural history, in which capacity he published the book "Lærer i Naturhistorie, i hvilken Egenskabin" 1851, which at the time was widely used as a school textbook.  He dealt equally diligently with the study of natural history, comparative anatomy and physiology.  His scientific reputation was such that in 1852 he gained a teaching post in hygiene studies at Veterinary and Agricultural University, where in 1858 he was appointed associate professor of  Dietetics and Animal Husbandry, being promoted to professor a year later.  he made several journeys abroad to study German and English breeds of farm animals and he was to have a significant impact on Danish agriculture in the late 19th century.  He was the author and co-author of many text books, articles and papers on animal health and wellbeing. He was a Knight of the Danneborg, a Danish honour similar to the Order of the British Empire.

Some Taxa named by Prosch
Bathypolypus arcticus (Prosch 1847)
Cranchiidae (Prosch 1847)
Teuthowenia megalops (Prosch 1849)

References

1820 births
1885 deaths